Mordecai ben Isaac Assaban (Mordekhai ben Yitḥzak Atzban; 1700, Meknes, Morocco – , Aleppo, Ottoman Syria) was an 18th-century rabbi, posek, and Kabbalist.

He was chief rabbi of Leghorn, and emigrated to Jerusalem about 1729, where he dwelt for thirty years. He was the author of a viddui, entitled "Zobe'aḥ Todah."

References
 

1700 births
18th-century Moroccan rabbis
Kabbalists
Moroccan emigrants to the Ottoman Empire
People from Meknes
Rabbis in Ottoman Syria
Year of death missing
18th-century Italian rabbis
18th-century rabbis in Jerusalem